Frederick William Rath (March 3, 1874 – August 7, 1954) was an American playwright and screenwriter.

Rath was born in New York.

He died in Monroe, New York.

Theater
Solitaire (March 1929), writer
Melodrama (1929), a play about Sing Sing
First Night (1930-1931), writer
Her Tin Soldier (1933), wrote and produced
Bigger Than Barnum (1946), co-wrote with Lee Sands

Films
Behind the Mask (1917)
The Mystic Hour (1917)
The Golden God (1917)
When You and I Were Young (1917)
Public Defender (1917)
Cab Calloway's Hi-De-Ho (1934)
Cab Calloway's Jitterbug Party (1935), written by Milton Hockey and Fred Rath 
Symphony in Black (1935)Give Out, Sisters (1941), original storySing a Jingle'' (1944) screenplay

References

American male dramatists and playwrights
1954 deaths
1874 births
20th-century American dramatists and playwrights
Screenwriters from New York (state)
20th-century American screenwriters
20th-century American male writers